Conception Island is an islet located in the Bahamas. It is an important rookery for nesting seabirds and hatching site for green turtles. It is uninhabited and protected as part of the Conception Island National Park.

In 2015, a species of boa called the Conception Bank silver boa (Chilabothrus argentum) was found to occur here; the new species is endemic to Conception as well as its satellite islets.

See also
 Geography of the Bahamas

References

External links 
 Conception Island
 Diving at Conception Island

Uninhabited islands of the Bahamas